Tehuelche or Tehuelches may refer to:
 the Tehuelche people of Patagonia
 the Tehuelche language, an extinct language once spoken by the Tehuelche people.
 Tehuelche (motorcycle), produced in Argentina from 1957 to 1964
 IA 51 Tehuelche single engined light utility aircraft, developed in the late 1950s in Argentina
 El Tehuelche Airport, Chubut province, Argentina, served by two commercial airlines and base of the local flying club
 Tehuelches Department, Chubut Province, Argentina
 Villa Tehuelches, a village in Magallanes Province, Chile

Language and nationality disambiguation pages